Paul Eugen Sieg (2 August 1899 – 2 May 1950) was a German physicist and writer.

1899 births
1950 deaths
20th-century German physicists
German science fiction writers
German male writers